Matthew Conlan

References

 

Portaferry hurlers
1993 births
Living people